Government Pharmacy College, Bangalore is a pharmacy college located in Bangalore, India, run by the government of Karnataka. It was established in 1964 and is affiliated with the Rajiv Gandhi University of Health Sciences. It is ranked among the top ten pharmacy institutions in India.

The former principals

 R. G. Battu
 M. Desai 
P.P. Thampi
M. Lakshmana
M.S.Niranjan
K.P.Chennabasavaraju
Chandrashekar.M.Sultanpur
current principal : Dr.Ramachandra Setty S

Notable alumni
Dr.J.Jagadish,Senior pharmacologist,U.S.F.D.A

References

External links

Pharmacy schools in India
Colleges in Bangalore
Colleges affiliated to Rajiv Gandhi University of Health Sciences
Educational institutions established in 1964
1964 establishments in Mysore State